Confederación Sindical Obrera y Agraria ('Labour and Agrarian Trade Union Confederation') was a trade union centre in Panama, founded in 1930 through the merger of Federación Obrera de la República and Sindicato General de los Trabajadores.

Clara González was the general secretary of the division of female and child labour of the organization.

References 

Trade unions in Panama
1930 establishments in Panama
Trade unions established in 1930